Lenka Kotková (née Šarounová; born 26 July 1973) is a Czech astronomer and a discoverer of minor planets.

She works at Observatoř Ondřejov (Ondřejov Observatory), located near Prague. Besides numerous main-belt asteroids she also discovered Mars-crosser asteroid 9671 Hemera and Hilda family asteroid 21804 Václavneumann.

Lenka Kotková studied meteorology at the faculty of Mathematics and Physics of the Charles University in Prague. Her tasks at the Astronomical institute AV ČR in Ondřejov are primarily the development of databases, spectroscopical and photometric observation, and data processing. During her work  at the department of inter planetary matter her main role was the observation of near-earth asteroids, along with Petr Pravec and Peter Kušnirák she identified a large proportion of known binary asteroids. In the same time period she discovered or co-discovered over one hundred asteroids. At the present time Lenka Kotková works in the stellar department as an observant with a two-metre Ondřejov telescope.

In the year 2000 she received the Zdeněk Kvíz Award of the Czech Astronomical Society for significant work in the research of variable stars.

The asteroid 10390 Lenka, discovered by her colleagues Petr Pravec and Marek Wolf in 1997, is named after her. The asteroid 60001 Adélka, discovered by her in 1999, is named after her daughter, while 7897 Bohuška, discovered by her in 1995, is named after her mother.

List of discovered minor planets

References 
 

1973 births
Czech astronomers
Discoverers of asteroids

Living people
Women astronomers
People from Prague-West District
Charles University alumni